Dorin Rotariu (born 29 July 1995) is a Romanian professional footballer who plays for Super League Greece team Atromitos, on loan from Ludogorets Razgrad. Primarily a winger, he can also be deployed as a second striker.

Rotariu moved from boyhood club Politehnica Timișoara to Dinamo București in 2012, aged 17. He amassed 122 Liga I appearances for "the White and Reds" over the course of several seasons, and in 2017 earned a transfer abroad to Club Brugge in Belgium. Two years later, after being loaned out to Mouscron and AZ Alkmaar, Rotariu joined Kazakh team Astana with which he won three domestic honours.

Internationally, he made his full debut for Romania in October 2016, and scored his first goal in a 1–0 friendly win over Sweden in March 2018.

Club career

Early years / Dinamo București
Rotariu played as a youngster for FC Politehnica Timișoara's academy, and in September 2012 was loaned to top-flight club Dinamo București. Several other teams had previously wished to sign him, including ACS Poli Timișoara—the supposed successor of FC Politehnica which was dissolved during the same month of the player's transfer. Rotariu chose to join Dinamo București in order to play alongside teammates from the national under-19 squad. He stayed with the reserve team before making his Liga I debut against Concordia Chiajna in March 2013, aged only 17 years and eight months.

After his loan expired in the summer of 2013, Dinamo București reached a full transfer agreement with the owner of the defunct FC Politehnica society, Marian Iancu, despite interest from fellow league side FC Vaslui. Rotariu was signed as a free agent, but the capital-based club promised to pay 50% of a future transfer fee to the businessman.  On the eve of his 18th birthday, Rotariu recorded his first goal in a match against FC Vaslui, which ended 2–0. On 11 August 2013, he netted in a derby against FC Steaua București. Twelve days later, he scored again in a 6–0 victory over Universitatea Cluj.

Rotariu was the most efficient young player in the first part of the 2016–17 Liga I campaign, having scored six goals and offering one assist.

Club Brugge
On 31 January 2017, the last day of the winter transfer window in Belgium, it was announced that Rotariu signed a three-and-a-half-year deal for an undisclosed fee with defending champions Club Brugge. He made his Belgian Pro League debut five days later, entering the pitch as an 80th-minute substitute in a 1–0 home victory over Charleroi at the Jan Breydel Stadium. His first goal came in a 2–1 home success over Zulte Waregem, on 1 May.

Loans to Mouscron and AZ Alkmaar
Rotariu agreed to a season-long loan deal with Royal Excel Mouscron on 31 August 2017, rejoining his former Dinamo București coach Mircea Rednic. He recorded his first goals in a Belgian Cup match with Tubize on 20 September, netting twice in the 3–1 win. Rotariu was again loaned for the following campaign, this time to Dutch club AZ Alkmaar.

Astana
After a move to 2. Bundesliga side Arminia Bielefeld fell through, Kazakh team FC Astana announced the transfer of Rotariu on a four-year contract on 26 February 2019. He made his competitive debut on 3 March, as Astana won 2–0 over Kairat in the Kazakhstan Super Cup.

Ludogorets Razgrad
On 17 June 2021, Bulgarian club Ludogorets Razgrad announced the signing of Rotariu.

Loan to Atromitos
On 25 January 2022, he joined Greek club Atromitos on a short-term loan.  On 4 July that year, his loan was extended until the summer of 2023.

International career
Rotariu was called up to the senior Romania squad to face Montenegro in September 2016. He earned his first cap on 8 October in a 5–0 win over Armenia, replacing Alexandru Chipciu in the 67th minute. Rotariu scored his first goal for the full side on 27 March 2018, coming on as a 53rd-minute substitute for Alexandru Mitriță and netting the only goal in the friendly against Sweden.

Style of play
Cristian Dulca, Rotariu's coach at the under-21 national team, said that ball control is the player's best quality, and that he advances well while looking for spaces.

Personal life
Rotariu's father Ilie was a footballer who totalled two games in the Romanian top tier, and has an identical twin named Iosif. The latter also played for Politehnica Timișoara and the Romania national team among others.

Career statistics

Club

International

Scores and results list Romania's goal tally first, score column indicates score after each Rotariu goal.

Honours
Dinamo București
Cupa României runner-up: 2015–16

Astana
Kazakhstan Premier League: 2019
Kazakhstan Super Cup: 2019, 2020; runner-up: 2021

Ludogorets Razgrad
Bulgarian Supercup: 2021

Individual
DigiSport Liga I Player of the Month: August 2016

References

External links

1995 births
Living people
Sportspeople from Timișoara
Romanian footballers
Association football forwards
Association football wingers
Liga I players
Liga II players
ACS Poli Timișoara players
FC Dinamo București players
Belgian Pro League players
Club Brugge KV players
Royal Excel Mouscron players
Eredivisie players
AZ Alkmaar players
Kazakhstan Premier League players
FC Astana players
First Professional Football League (Bulgaria) players
PFC Ludogorets Razgrad players
Super League Greece players
Atromitos F.C. players
Romania youth international footballers
Romania under-21 international footballers
Romania international footballers
Romanian expatriate footballers
Expatriate footballers in Belgium
Romanian expatriate sportspeople in Belgium
Expatriate footballers in the Netherlands
Romanian expatriate sportspeople in the Netherlands
Expatriate footballers in Kazakhstan
Romanian expatriate sportspeople in Kazakhstan
Expatriate footballers in Bulgaria
Romanian expatriate sportspeople in Bulgaria
Expatriate footballers in Greece
Romanian expatriate sportspeople in Greece